Browse Island is a small, approximately , uninhabited island lying in the Timor Sea about  north-west of the Kimberley coast of north-western Australia. It is a Western Australian Nature Reserve that is classed as 'Not Class A' vested with the state Conservation Commission and managed by the Department of Environment and Conservation. It is considered Western Australia's most remote island, and is also one of the most remote Australian islands to not fall under external territory status.

Environment

Fauna
The island is an important nesting site for green turtles as well as seabirds. Introduced house mice are present. It is surrounded by extensive coral reefs. The waters around the island are a site of upwelling associated with concentrations of tropical krill, and there have been unconfirmed reports of humpback whales feeding there.

Human impact
The island was mined for guano from 1870 to 1890. There are nine historic shipwrecks around the island, including one which is listed on the Register of the National Estate. There is a helipad which is used by the oil and gas industry. The surrounding waters are visited by Indonesian fishers as the island lies in the MOU 74 Box area allowing traditional Indonesian fishing activities within the Australian Fishing Zone.

It is rumoured the island was used during World War 2 by the American Navy.

An acetylene powered lighthouse was constructed on the southern end of the island in 1945, it was later converted to solar power in 1985.

The production liquid natural gas platform Ichthys Explorer is located near the island. It is the world's largest semi-submersible platform.

Notes and references

External links
 Arrecifes e islas australianas en el Mar de Timor (Spanish)

Islands of the Kimberley (Western Australia)
Protected areas of Western Australia
Uninhabited islands of Australia